Cameron Lewis (born April 13, 1997) is an American football cornerback for the Buffalo Bills of the National Football League (NFL). He was signed by the Buffalo Bills as an undrafted free agent in 2019. He played college football at the University at Buffalo.

College career
Lewis received scholarship offers to play college football at Toledo and Western Michigan but ultimately attended the University at Buffalo, where he played on the Buffalo Bulls football team from 2015 to 2018.

As a freshman on November 11, 2015, Lewis returned an interception 68 yards for a touchdown during a game against Northern Illinois. As a junior in 2017, injuries limited him to only seven games. On September 11, 2018, he was named the Mid-American Conference East Defensive Player of the Week after recording two interceptions in a game against Temple. As a senior in 2018, despite missing time with a high-ankle sprain, Lewis led the team in interceptions and passes defended and was named to the All-MAC Second-team Defense.

Professional career

Buffalo Bills
Lewis was signed by the Buffalo Bills as an undrafted free agent following the conclusion of the 2019 NFL Draft. He was waived on August 31, 2019, and was signed to the practice squad the next day. He signed a reserve/future contract with the Bills on January 6, 2020.

On September 5, 2020, Lewis was waived by the Bills and signed to the practice squad the next day. He was elevated to the active roster on September 12 for the week 1 game against the New York Jets and made his NFL debut in that game, appearing on six special teams plays. He was reverted to the practice squad the day after the game. He was promoted to the active roster on September 17. He was waived on October 1 and re-signed to the practice squad the next day. He was promoted back to the active roster on October 7. Lewis made his first career NFL start on October 13 against the Tennessee Titans. On Tennessee's first play from scrimmage, Lewis stopped Derrick Henry, the previous season's leading rusher, at the line of scrimmage for the first tackle of his career. He tallied seven total tackles on the day. He was placed on injured reserve on October 31.

On August 31, 2021, Lewis was waived by the Bills and re-signed to the practice squad the next day. On October 3, 2021, Lewis forced his first career fumble in a game against the Houston Texans. He was signed to the active roster on November 11, 2021.

On March 13, 2023, Lewis signed a one-year contract extension.

References

External links
 Buffalo Bulls bio
 Buffalo Bills bio

1997 births
Living people
American football cornerbacks
Buffalo Bills players
Buffalo Bulls football players
Players of American football from Detroit